Sana Dafa Gomes (born 9 July 2002) is a Bissau-Guinean professional footballer who plays as a left-back for the UAE Pro League club Al Wasl.

Club career
A youth product of Estrela, Real S.C. and Alverca, Gomes moved to Portimonense on 16 July 2021. Gomes made his professional debut with Portimonense in a 3–2 Primeira Liga loss to Sporting CP on 29 December 2021.

References

External links
 
 

2002 births
Living people
Sportspeople from Bissau
Bissau-Guinean footballers
Association football fullbacks
Portimonense S.C. players
Al-Wasl F.C. players
Primeira Liga players
UAE Pro League players
Bissau-Guinean expatriate footballers
Bissau-Guinean expatriates in Portugal
Expatriate footballers in Portugal
Expatriate footballers in the United Arab Emirates